SubArachnoid Space was a San Francisco, California-based psychedelic rock band founded in 1996 by Mason Jones, the owner of the independent music label Charnel Music. Initially the band was a trio (Mason Jones: guitar, Jason Stein: bass, Michelle Schreiber: drums) and the debut 7" single release was by the trio. Before the band's first live show, performed at KFJC radio, second guitarist Melynda Jackson joined. That quartet toured for a few years before Michelle moved to Texas and Jason left to pursue other interests. Chris Van Huffle joined as drummer and Andey Koa Stephens took over role on bass. The role of bassist shifted several times when Stephens left in 2002 to work with David Starfire, but the rest of the lineup remained consistent until 2003, when Mason left the group so they could tour more. Shortly thereafter the band's core of Melynda and Chris relocated to Portland Oregon, where they continued to perform, tour and release albums.  The band completed a fall tour of the US with the Italian group OVO in September/October 2009 before disbanding on August 13, 2010. This was accompanied by a farewell show at Mississippi studios. Melynda Jackson and Chris Van Huffle went on to form Eight Bells.

Selected discography

Studio Albums 
Delicate Membrane (1996), Charnel Music
Endless Renovation (1998), Release Records
A New and Exact Map (2000), September Gurls
Also Rising (2003), Strange Attractors
The Red Veil (2005), Strange Attractors
Eight Bells (2009), Crucial Blast

Singles 
"Char-Broiled Wonderland" 7-inch single (1996), Charnel Music

Split LPs 
Tigris / Euphrates split LP with Bardo Pond (2002), Camera Obscura

Collaborative Albums 
The Sleeping Sickness (1999), Elsie & Jack

Live Albums 
Ether Or (1997), Unit Circle Records
Almost Invisible (1997), Release Records
Endless Renovation (1998), Release Records
These Things Take Time (2000), Release Records

Former members
Melynda Jackson – guitar
Chris Van Huffel – drums
Daniel Barone – bass
Erik Moggridge – guitar
Mason Jones – guitar
Jason Stein - bass guitar
Andey Koa Stephens– bass guitar
Chris Cones – guitar
Diego Gonzalez – bass guitar
Stooert Odom – bass guitar
Michael Shiono - bass
Rus Archer - guitar
Daniel Osborne - guitar
Lauren K. Newman - drums
Bryan Sours - drums

References
 Oregonian Sound Check:

External links
 Band's biography / discography
 Official site
 Official MySpace
 Band's site on Epitonic

Musical groups from San Francisco
Psychedelic rock music groups from California